USS Steamer Bay (CVE-87) was a  of the United States Navy. She was named after Steamer Bay, located within Etolin Island, Alaska. Launched in February 1944, and commissioned in April, she served in support of the Invasion of Lingayen Gulf, the Invasion of Iwo Jima, and the Battle of Okinawa. Postwar, she participated in Operation Magic Carpet. She was decommissioned in January 1947, when she was mothballed in the Pacific Reserve Fleet. Ultimately, she was sold for scrapping in August 1959.

Design and description

Steamer Bay was a Casablanca-class escort carrier, the most numerous type of aircraft carriers ever built, and designed specifically to be mass-produced using prefabricated sections, in order to replace heavy early war losses. She displaced  standard,  with a full load. She was powered with two Unaflow reciprocating steam engines, which drove two shafts, providing , thus enabling her to make . Her compact size necessitated the installment of an aircraft catapult at her bow, and there were two aircraft elevators to facilitate movement of aircraft between the flight and hangar decks: one each fore and aft.

One /38 caliber dual-purpose gun was mounted on the stern. Anti-aircraft defense was provided by eight  Bofors anti-aircraft guns in single mounts, as well as twelve  Oerlikon cannons, which were mounted around the perimeter of the deck. By the end of the war, Casablanca-class carriers had been modified to carry thirty 20–mm cannons, and the amount of 40–mm guns had been doubled to sixteen, by putting them into twin mounts. These modifications were in response to increasing casualties due to kamikaze attacks. Casablanca-class escort carriers were designed to carry 27 aircraft, but the hangar deck could accommodate more. During the Invasion of Lingayen Gulf, the Invasion of Iwo Jima, and the Battle of Okinawa, she carried 16 FM-2 Wildcat fighters, and 12 TBM-3 Avenger torpedo bombers, for a total of 28 aircraft.

Construction
The escort carrier was laid down on 4 December 1943, under a Maritime Commission contract, MC hull 1124, by Kaiser Shipbuilding Company, Vancouver, Washington. She was named Steamer Bay, as part of a tradition which named escort carriers after bays or sounds in Alaska. She was launched on 26 February 1944; sponsored by Mrs. Henry S. Kendall; transferred to the United States Navy and commissioned on 4 April 1944, Captain Myron Steadman Teller in command.

Service history

World War II

After being commissioned, Steamer Bay conducted trials and went on a shakedown cruise down the West Coast, before arriving at San Diego. On 14 May, she sailed for the New Hebrides, transporting Marine Air Group (MAG) 61. She arrived at Espiritu Santo on 30 May, where her cargo was unloaded. She departed on 2 June, arriving at San Diego on 20 June. On 19 July, she loaded 298 marines and 72 aircraft, and proceeded westwards for the Marshall Islands. She hence arrived at Majuro on 1 August, where she discharged her cargo. She headed for Pearl Harbor, where she was attached to the United States Third Fleet to store replacement aircraft to support the ongoing Mariana and Palau Islands campaign and the Philippines campaign. Seventy-two planes were loaded onto Steamer Bay, and she sailed for Seeadler Harbor, Manus Island, arriving on 21 August. Throughout the next two and a half months, she remained on station, providing replacement aircraft and crew for Task Group 38. After completing her duties, she returned to Pearl Harbor, where she underwent repairs and training from 15 November to 5 December.

Steamer Bay departed back to Seeadler Harbor, arriving on 17 December. There, she was assigned to Task Group 77.4 (Taffy 2), commanded by Rear Admiral Felix Stump, which had previously participated in the Battle of Leyte Gulf. The task force consisted of six escort carriers and their escorts. On 1 January 1945, the task force sortied out of Seeadler Harbor, in support of the Invasion of Lingayen Gulf. En route, the escort carriers came under heavy aerial attacks. Steamer Bay herself narrowly missed being hit, with a kamikaze once flying dangerously close to her stern. Throughout the landings, the escort carrier task groups anchored offshore launched over 1,400 aircraft sorties in support of the operation. In the middle of operations, Taffy 2 was reformed under Rear Admiral Felix Stump, partially because of the losses and damages suffered by the escort carriers. In anticipation for possible Japanese counterattacks on American positions on Mindoro and Luzon, the task group proceeded south to operate in the waters offshore Mindoro. Steamer Bay remained in the Philippine Islands with the rest of the 7th Fleet until 31 January, when she departed for Ulithi.

Steamer Bay was only anchored for five days, before she departed with the rest of the 5th Fleet, bound for Iwo Jima. She was incorporated into Carrier Division 26, under the command of Rear Admiral Clifton Sprague, alongside four other escort carriers. The task group's mission was to neutralize Japanese bases and positions along the Nanpō Islands until 19 February (D-Day). The task group then provided close air support for the marines throughout the landings and the costly struggle throughout the island.

They arrived at San Pedro Bay on 12 March, where she prepared for the upcoming invasion of Okinawa Island. She sailed for the Ryukyu Islands on 27 March, arriving in her operating area south of the island on the morning of 1 April. Operations were complicated by uncooperative weather and choppy seas. On 3 April, a sailor was cast overboard when a railing broke. His body was not recovered. She conducted operations until 26 May when she was relieved, and sailed to Apra Harbor, Guam, for repairs and rest. On 10 June, she was ordered to join the 3rd Fleet east of Miyako Jima assisted her task group in neutralizing Japanese airfields on Sakishima Gunto. She conducted air strikes against the airfields from 14 June to 22 June, before sailing for Ulithi.

Steamer Bay left Ulithi on 3 July, part of the Logistics Support Group, responsible for resupplying the fast carrier forces with aircraft during operations against the Japanese mainland. On 20 July, she was detached and sailed, making stops at Guam and Pearl Harbor, for the West Coast, arriving at San Diego on 10 August.

Post war
Steamer Bay was in dry dock when the Japanese surrender was announced. When repairs were finished, she became a part of the Operation Magic Carpet fleet, which repatriated U.S. servicemen from around the Pacific. To support her new role, bunk beds were installed within the hangar deck to accommodate veterans returning from overseas. On 28 September, she sailed for Pearl Harbor, on her first Magic Carpet run.

After completing her Magic Carpet duties, Steamer Bay was assigned to the Pacific Reserve Fleet on 4 February 1946, and berthed at Tacoma, Washington. In January 1947, she was placed in reserve, and decommissioned. Her designation was changed to CVHE-87 on 12 June 1955. She was struck from the Navy list on 1 March 1959, and sold to Hyman-Michaels Co., Chicago, Illinois, on 29 August 1959, for scrapping. She received six battle stars for her World War II service.

References

Sources

Online sources

Bibliography

External links 

 

 

Casablanca-class escort carriers
World War II escort aircraft carriers of the United States
Ships built in Vancouver, Washington
1944 ships
S4-S2-BB3 ships